Dizin (often called “Dizi” or “Maji” in the literature) is an Omotic language of the Afro-Asiatic language family spoken by the Dizi people, primarily in the Maji woreda of the Southern Nations, Nationalities and Peoples Region, located in southwestern Ethiopia. The 2007 census listed 33,927 speakers.  
A population of 17,583 was identified as  monolinguals in 1994.

The language has basic SOV (subject–object–verb) word order, tones, and is largely suffixing. Phonologically, "Features of the Dizin sound system include glottalized consonants, syllabic nasals, lengthened vowels, three phonemic tone levels and contour tones. Western Dizin has phonemic retroflex consonants. The glottal stop is analyzed as phonemic word initially before nasals, but not phonemic elsewhere". (Beachy 2005:iv)

Dizin, together with the Sheko and Nayi languages, is part of a cluster of languages variously called "Maji" or "Dizoid".

Notes

References 
 Allan, Edward. 1976. Dizi. In The Non-Semitic Languages of Ethiopia, M. Lionel Bender, ed., pp. 377–392. East Lansing, Michigan: African Studies Center, Michigan State University.
 Beachy, Marvin Dean. 2005. An overview of Central Dizin phonology and morphology.  M.A. thesis, University of Texas at Arlington.
 Breeze, Mary. 1988. Phonological features of Gimira and Dizi.  In Marianne Bechhaus-Gerst and Fritz Serzisko (eds.), Cushitic – Omotic: papers from the International Symposium on Cushitic and Omotic languages, Cologne, January 6–9, 1986, 473–487. Hamburg: Helmut Buske Verlag.
 Muldrow, William. 1976. Languages of the Maji area. In Language in Ethiopia, ed. by Bender, Bowen, Cooper, and Ferguson, pp. 603–607.  Oxford University Press.
 
 Savá, Graziano and Mauro Tosco. An Annotated Edition of Father G. Toselli’s Dizi Grammar. (Cushitic and Omotic Studies, 5.) Köln: Rüdiger Köppe Verlag, 2016); viii,185 pp., 3 maps, 128illus., 9 tables, graphs.

External links
 World Atlas of Language Structures information on Dizi
 Dizi basic lexicon at the Global Lexicostatistical Database

Languages of Ethiopia
Dizoid languages